Sphaerodactylus phyzacinus is a small species of gecko endemic to Guadeloupe.

References

Sphaerodactylus
Endemic fauna of Guadeloupe
Reptiles of Guadeloupe
Reptiles described in 1964